Jaco Phillipus van Zyl (born 23 February 1979) is a professional golfer from South Africa.

Career
Van Zyl was born in Pretoria. He won the South African Amateur in 2000 and turned professional the following year, immediately joining the Sunshine Tour. He won for the first time on the tour at the Platinum Classic in 2005.

In 2007, van Zyl played on the PGA Tour, having gained his card at the 2006 qualifying school. He made the 36-hole cut only four times in 21 tournaments during his rookie season and finished 227th on the money list.

In 2009, van Zyl recorded the biggest win of his career at the Telkom PGA Championship and went on to win twice more during the season and finish in 4th place on the Order of Merit. Having won four more tournaments on the Sunshine Tour in 2010, Van Zyl ended the year by finishing in 5th place at the final stage of the European Tour's qualifying school to earn his place on European Tour for the 2011 season. He had a good first season with five top-10 placings and finished 50th on the Race to Dubai. This included a playoff loss at the Trophée Hassan II in April. David Horsey beat van Zyl and Rhys Davies when he birdied the second extra hole of the playoff.

In November 2015, van Zyl finished runner-up at the Turkish Airlines Open. He placed one shot behind Victor Dubuisson, after being tied for the lead after 54 holes.

In February 2016, van Zyl reached the top 50 in the Official World Golf Ranking for the first time.

In January 2017, van Zyl was defeated in a sudden-death playoff on the European Tour for the second time. He lost to Wang Jeung-hun at the Commercial Bank Qatar Masters, who birdied the first extra hole to defeat van Zyl and Joakim Lagergren.

In September 2022, van Zyl won his first tournament in over six years at the Gary & Vivienne Player Challenge. He finished two shots ahead of Hennie Otto.

Amateur wins
2000 South African Amateur

Professional wins (16)

Sunshine Tour wins (15)

Sunshine Tour playoff record (3–3)

Other wins (1)
2003 Event 6 – State mines G.C. (Diners Club Tour)

Playoff record
European Tour playoff record (0–2)

Results in major championships

CUT = missed the half-way cut
"T" = tied

Results in World Golf Championships
Results not in chronological order before 2015.

QF, R16, R32, R64 = Round in which player lost in match play
"T" = tied

Team appearances
Amateur
Eisenhower Trophy (representing South Africa): 2000

Professional
World Cup (representing South Africa): 2016

See also
2006 PGA Tour Qualifying School graduates
2010 European Tour Qualifying School graduates

References

External links

South African male golfers
Sunshine Tour golfers
PGA Tour golfers
European Tour golfers
Olympic golfers of South Africa
Golfers at the 2016 Summer Olympics
Sportspeople from Pretoria
White South African people
1979 births
Living people